Chanson (French for "song") can refer to:

Music
 Chanson (band), a 1970s disco group
 The French chanson, songs from the late Middle Ages to modern times, including lyric-driven French songs in the cabaret style
 Chanson de geste, a medieval French epic poetry form
 Nouvelle Chanson, a new style of popular music originating in France
 Russian Chanson, a genre of Russian music
 Canso (song) or canson, a song style used by early troubadours

Pieces 
 Trois Chansons (Ravel)

Albums
 Chanson: The Space In Between, an album by Barb Jungr
 Chansons (Élie Semoun album), 2003
 Chansons (Jill Barber album), 2013

Brands
 Citroën Saxo or Citroën Chanson, a French car sold in Japan